The Battle Creek Open was a golf tournament on the LPGA Tour, played only in 1955. It was played at the Battle Creek Country Club in Battle Creek, Michigan. Beverly Hanson won the event.

References

Former LPGA Tour events
Golf in Michigan
Sports in Battle Creek, Michigan
History of women in Michigan
1955 establishments in Michigan
1955 disestablishments in Michigan